Mike Cooper may refer to:
Mike Cooper (musician) (born 1942), English blues and jazz guitarist and singer-songwriter
Mike Cooper (politician) (born 1951), former politician in Ontario, Canada

See also
Michael Cooper (disambiguation)
Mike Hooper (disambiguation)